The Gallerie dell'Accademia is a museum gallery of pre-19th-century art in Venice, northern Italy. It is housed in the Scuola della Carità on the south bank of the Grand Canal, within the sestiere of Dorsoduro. It was originally the gallery of the Accademia di Belle Arti di Venezia, the art academy of Venice, from which it became independent in 1879, and for which the Ponte dell'Accademia and the Accademia boat landing station for the vaporetto water bus are named. The two institutions remained in the same building until 2004, when the art school moved to the Ospedale degli Incurabili.

History

Early history

The Accademia di Belle Arti di Venezia was founded on 24 September 1750; the statute dates from 1756. The first director was Giovanni Battista Piazzetta; Gianbattista Tiepolo became the first president after his return from Würzburg.

It was one of the first institutions to study art restoration starting in 1777 with Pietro Edwards, and formalised by 1819 as a course.

In 1807 the academy was re-founded by Napoleonic decree. The name was changed from Veneta Academia di Pittura, Scultura e Architettura to Accademia Reale di Belle Arti, "royal academy of fine arts", and the academy was moved to the Palladian complex of the Scuola della Carità, where the Gallerie dell'Accademia are still housed. The collections of the Accademia were first opened to the public on 10 August 1817.

Later history
The Gallerie dell'Accademia became independent from the Accademia di Belle Arti di Venezia in 1879. Like other state museums in Italy, it falls under the Ministero per i Beni e le Attività Culturali, the Italian ministry of culture and heritage.

Building

The Napoleonic administration had disbanded many institutions in Venice including some churches, convents and Scuole. The Scuola della Carità, the Convento dei Canonici Lateranensi and the church of Santa Maria della Carità thus became the home of the Accademia. The Scuola della Carità was the oldest of the six Scuole Grandi and the building dates back to 1343, though the scuola was formed in 1260. The Convento dei Canonici Lateranensi was started in 1561 by Andrea Palladio, though it was never fully completed. The facade of Santa Maria della Carità was completed in 1441 by Bartolomeo Bon.

Collection

The Gallerie dell’Accademia contains masterpieces of Venetian painting up to the 18th century, generally arranged chronologically though some thematic displays are evident.

Artists represented include:
Antonello da Messina, 
Lazzaro Bastiani,
Gentile and Giovanni Bellini, 
Bernardo Bellotto, 
Pacino di Bonaguida, Canaletto, 
Vittore Carpaccio, 
Giulio Carpioni, 
Rosalba Carriera, 
Cima da Conegliano, 
Domenico Fetti, 
Pietro Gaspari, 
Michele Giambono, 
Luca Giordano, 
Francesco Guardi, 
Giorgione, 
Johann Liss, 
Charles Le Brun,
Leonardo da Vinci,
Pietro Longhi, 
Lorenzo Lotto, 
Andrea Mantegna,
Rocco Marconi, 
Michele Marieschi, 
Giambattista Piazzetta,
Giambattista Pittoni, 
Mattia Preti, 
Giovanni Battista Tiepolo, 
Tintoretto, 
Titian, 
Paolo Veronese,
Giorgio Vasari,
Alvise Vivarini, and
Giuseppe Zais.

The collection includes Leonardo da Vinci's drawing of the Vitruvian Man, which is displayed only rarely as the work, being on paper, is fragile and sensitive to light. In 2019, the Musée du Louvre in Paris requested the loan of the drawing for its exhibition of works by Leonardo. The request was refused by a cultural heritage group. A court tribunal in Venice, however, decided that the work would suffer no ill effects if shipped with great care and displayed under controlled conditions. The work was, therefore, part of the Louvre's exhibition from 24 October 2019 to 24 February 2020.

Highlights

See also
 List of buildings and structures in Venice

References

External links

 
Buildings and structures completed in 1343
Accademia di Belle Arti di Venezia
Art museums and galleries in Venice
Accademia
Art museums established in 1750
1750 establishments in the Republic of Venice
Renaissance architecture in Venice